Kyzyl-Asker ("Red Army") is a village in the Chüy Region of Kyrgyzstan. Its population was 536 in 2021.

References

Populated places in Chüy Region